Nico Herzig (born 10 December 1983) is a German former professional footballer who played as a centre-back. His brother, Denny, is also a footballer. Nico Herzig retired in December 2020.

References

External links
 
 

1983 births
Living people
People from Pößneck
Footballers from Thuringia
German footballers
Association football defenders
Wimbledon F.C. players
SV Wacker Burghausen players
Alemannia Aachen players
Arminia Bielefeld players
SV Wehen Wiesbaden players
Würzburger Kickers players
TSV Steinbach Haiger players
Bundesliga players
2. Bundesliga players
3. Liga players
Regionalliga players
German expatriate footballers
German expatriate sportspeople in England
Expatriate footballers in England